Rukunuddin Kaikaus was an independent Sultan of Bengal who ruled from 1291–1300 CE. He succeeded his father Nasiruddin Bughra Khan.  In several inscriptions and coins he styled himself as Sultan bin al-Sultan bin al-Sultan (the Sultan, son of a Sultan, son of a Sultan) and  also Sultan-us-Salatin (the Sultan of Sultans).

History
Kaikaus ascended the throne after the abdication of his father Nasiruddin Bughra Khan.

During his reign, he had divided his kingdom into two parts - Bihar and Lakhnauti, and appointed Ikhtiyaruddin Firoz Itgin as the Governor of Bihar and Shahabuddin Zafar Khan Bahram Itgin as the Governor of Lakhnauti. Zafar Khan Itgin conquered Satgaon in south-western Bengal. His kingdom extended to Bihar in the west, Devkot in the north and Satgaon in the south. He put a vast kingdom under his control. Delhi Sultan Alauddin Khalji also accepted Kaikaus's independent dominance of Bengal.

On Muharram 692 AH (1292-1293 CE), Kaikaus ordered Ikhtiyaruddin Firuz Aitigin to construct a mosque north of Maheswar in Bihar, on the banks of the Burhi Gandak River.

Rukunuddin Kaikaus ruled Bengal for nine years and died in 1300. It is assumed that he was childless. He was succeeded by his probable brother, Shamsuddin Firoz Shah.

See also
 List of rulers of Bengal
 History of Bengal
 History of India

References

1300 deaths
13th-century Indian Muslims
13th-century Indian monarchs
Sultans of Bengal
Year of birth unknown